Life Bar is a South Korean Talk show distributed by tvN every Thursday night at 11:00. Season 1 broadcast its final episode on April 13, 2017. Season 2 premiered on May 18, 2017.

Format
It is a unique talk show where celebrity guests and the three show hosts candidly share their life stories over a drink. The ratings for the show were upped to "19+", making it the only R-rated show on tvN.

Although it is a talk show entertainment program, it contains live drinking scenes. It broadcasts on the 15-year-old broadcast, and it was broadcast by the audience rating of 19 years old or over. However, after the second store, It is broadcasting again with a 15-year-old rating.

permanent segment:
 Masterpiece of Love: A quote to explain your life.

Broadcaster

Host

Employees

List of episodes

Ratings
In the ratings below, the highest rating for the show will be in red, and the lowest rating for the show will be in blue each year.

2016

2017

2018

2019 

 Note that the show airs on a cable channel (pay TV), which plays part in its slower uptake and relatively small audience share when compared to programs broadcast (FTA) on public networks such as KBS, SBS, MBC or EBS.

Awards

References

2016 South Korean television series debuts
2019 South Korean television series endings
Korean-language television shows
South Korean variety television shows
Television series by SM C&C